Peter Reynolds (born Peter Gordon Horrocks; 16 August 1921 – 22 April 1975) was an English actor.

Career
Most of his career was spent in B films, as "the archetypal spiv, unreliable boyfriend, unscrupulous blackmailer, the smoothie ever ready to light a lady's cigarette".

He starred in two early films for John Guillermin. He played Hilaire in episode 28 of The Adventures of William Tell, The Avenger (1959).

In 1969 Reynolds moved to Australia, where his career gained a second wind. He appeared in over two dozen roles in his first six years there (1969 to 1974, inclusive), mainly on TV. Amongst his appearances was a leading role in the black comedy film Private Collection (1972). He also appeared in Woodbine cigarette commercials. He lived alone, apart from his little dog, in Sydney; his brother lived in the same city.

Death

He and his dog died in a fire in his flat in Oxford Street, Paddington, Melbourne, on 22 April 1975. The fire was caused by Reynolds smoking in bed.

Selected filmography

 There Is No Escape (1948)
 The Guinea Pig (1948) - Grimmett
 Things Happen at Night (1948)
 Adam and Evelyne (1949) - David
 Guilt Is My Shadow (1950) - Jamie
 Smart Alec (1951) - Alec Albion
 Four Days (1951) - Johnny Keylin
 The Magic Box (1951) - Bridegroom in Wedding Group
 The Last Page (1952) - Jeffrey Hart
 The Woman's Angle (1952) - Brian Mansell
 24 Hours of a Woman's Life (1952) - Peter
 I Vinti (1953) - Aubrey
 The Robe (1953) - Lucius (uncredited)
 The Good Beginning (1953) - Brian Watson
 Black 13 (1953) - Stephen
 Devil Girl from Mars (1954) - Robert Justin, alias Albert Simpson
 One Just Man (1954) - Playboy
 Destination Milan (1954)
 The Delavine Affair (1955) - Rex Banner
 Born for Trouble (1955)
 You Can't Escape (1956) - Rodney Nixon
 The Long Haul (1957) - Frank
 The Bank Raiders (1958) - Terry Milligan
 Shake Hands with the Devil (1959) - Captain 'Black & Tans'
 Wrong Number (1959) - Angelo
 Dial 999 (TV series) (1959) - ('Rolling Racketeers', episode) - Tyler
 Your Money or Your Wife (1960) - Theodore Malek
 The Challenge (1960) - Buddy
 The Hands of Orlac (1960) - Mr. Felix
 The Breaking Point (1961) - Eric Winlatter
 Man Who Couldn't Walk (1961) - Keefe Brand
 Highway to Battle (1961) - Jarvost
 Spare the Rod (1961) - Alec Murray
 A Question of Suspense (1961) - Tellman Drew
 Gaolbreak (1962) - Eddie Wallis
 The Painted Smile (1962) - Mark
 West 11 (1963) - Jacko
 Daleks' Invasion Earth 2150 A.D. (1966) - Man on Bicycle
 Private Collection (1972) - Henry-Adrian Phillips

References

External links

1921 births
1975 deaths
English male stage actors
English male film actors
English male television actors
People from Cheshire
20th-century English male actors
Deaths from fire
Accidental deaths in Victoria (Australia)
British expatriates in Australia